Wei Zongwan (born 24 November 1938) is a Chinese actor. He has been acting since the 1980s and has appeared in over 70 films and television shows.

He has won the Golden Rooster Award for Best Supporting Actor for his role in San Mao Joins the Army (1993), and was nominated in the Macau International Movie Festival for Best Supporting Actor for his role in A Singing Fairy (2010).

Early life
Wei was born in Shanghai on November 24, 1938, in the Republic of China, with his ancestral home in Ningbo, Zhejiang.

After graduating from Shanghai Nanyang Model Junior High School in 1955 he entered the Shanghai Turbine Plant worked as a bench worker, and joined a drama team in that factory.

Wei graduated from Shanghai Theatre Academy in 1963, majoring in acting. After university, he was assigned to the Shanghai People's Art Theatre. In a very long time in the Shanghai People's Art Theatre, he acted insignificant roles vividly. When watching the sketch he acted, Hou Baolin, a xiangsheng artist, commented:"It is just perfect and leaves some leeway. Being insufficient is better than overdoing."

Acting career
Wei had his first experience in front of a camera in 1982, when he was chosen to act as a supporting actor in One and Eight, the first film of the 5th generation of directors.

In 1992, he appeared in Zhang Jianya's San Mao Joins the Army, which earned him a Golden Rooster Award for Best Supporting Actor.

In 1991, he starred as Sima Yi in Zhang Shaolin's Romance of the Three Kingdoms, a historical television series where he co-starred with Tang Guoqiang, Bao Guo'an and Sun Yanjun, which was adapted from Luo Guanzhong's classical novel of the same title.

In 1997, he played a supporting role in Zhang Shaolin's television series The Water Margin, which was adapted from Shi Nai'an's classical novel of the same title.

In 2010, he participated in a romantic comedy called A Singing Fairy as "Laomo", he was nominated for "Best Supporting Actor" at the 2nd Macau International Movie Festival.

In 2014, he acted as a supporting actor in Wei Zheng's romantic comedy television series IPPrtment 4, a hot TV series starring Eric Wang, Deng Jiajia, Michael Chen, Loura Lou, Kimi Li, Jean Lee, Sean Sun and Vanessa Zhao recently in Heilongjiang, Anhui, Dragon and Hubei four major Television.

Personal life
Wei married Zhou Weiming, is a retired primary school teacher. They have a stepdaughter named Yu Hong and a biological daughter.

Filmography

Film

Television

Variety show

Awards

References

External links

1938 births
Male actors from Shanghai
Shanghai Theatre Academy alumni
Living people
Chinese male film actors
Chinese male television actors
20th-century Chinese male actors
21st-century Chinese male actors